Yager House may refer to:

Yager House (Anchorage, Kentucky), listed on the National Register of Historic Places in Jefferson County, Kentucky
Yager House (Goshen, Kentucky), listed on the National Register of Historic Places in Oldham County, Kentucky
John and Carrie Yager House, Mentor, Ohio, listed on the National Register of Historic Places in Lake County, Ohio